Yil is a Torricelli language of Papua New Guinea.

External links 
 Paradisec has a collection of Don Laycock's (DL2) that includes Yil language materials.

References

Wapei languages
Languages of Sandaun Province